Tomorrow Will Be Different: Love, Loss, and the Fight for Trans Equality is a 2018 memoir by Sarah McBride, published by Crown Archetype, an imprint of Penguin Random House.

Background
McBride's speech at the 2016 Democratic National Convention included the phrase "But I believe tomorrow can be different."

Contents

The book is a memoir of McBride, particularly since making national headlines when she came out as transgender to her college while serving as student body president at American University in 2011.

The book foreword is by Joe Biden, former Vice President and current President of the United States. An advance release of the text, in which Biden called transgender equality the "civil rights issue of our time" was widely covered on its advanced release in October 2017.

Publication and reception

McBride narrates the audio book, which runs 9 hours, 18 minutes.

The book received advanced praise from Senator Kamala Harris, Jennifer Finney Boylan, Cecile Richards, and Chad Griffin. It received a starred review from the American Library Association's Booklist.

The book's starred review from magazine Kirkus Reviews says that "throughout, the author ably balances great accomplishments and strong emotions. Reading McBride’s inspiring story will make it harder to ostracize or demonize others with similar stories to share."

Paste named the book as one of the one of 2018's 25 most anticipated books, describing it as "informative, heartbreaking and empowering", and "a must-read, offering encouragement while showing that the fight for equality is just getting started." It was also included on a preview of 2018 queer and feminist books on Autostraddle.

References

External links
 
 Kirkus review
After Words interview with McBride on Tomorrow Will Be Different, March 24, 2018

2010s LGBT literature
2018 non-fiction books
LGBT literature in the United States
Transgender autobiographies
Crown Publishing Group books